Arthur Laborde (17 May 1875 – 25 August 1951) was a Barbadian cricketer. He played in one first-class match for the Barbados cricket team in 1895/96.

See also
 List of Barbadian representative cricketers

References

External links
 

1875 births
1951 deaths
Barbadian cricketers
Barbados cricketers
People from Kingstown